Motherly is a 2009 Belgian comedy-drama film directed by Philippe Blasband. The film tells the story of Viviane, who after the death of her mother, gets visits from her ghost.

The film received two nominations at the 1st Magritte Awards.

References

External links

Belgian comedy-drama films
2009 comedy-drama films
2000s French-language films
2009 comedy films
2009 drama films
French-language Belgian films